Horace Mann School is a highly selective independent college preparatory school in New York City

Horace Mann School may also refer to:
 Mann Arts and Science Magnet Middle School, middle school in Little Rock, Arkansas
 Horace Mann School Beverly Hills, K-8 school in Beverly Hills, California
 Horace Mann Elementary School (Oak Park, Illinois)
 Horace Mann High School, a former school of the Gary Community School Corporation in Gary, Indiana
 Horace Mann School for the Deaf and Hard of Hearing, a pre-K-12 school in Allston (Boston), Massachusetts
 Barnstable Horace Mann Charter School, a 5-6 school in Marstons Mills, Massachusetts
 Horace Mann School (St. Louis, Missouri), a National Register of Historic Places (NRHP) listing in St. Louis, Missouri
 Horace Mann School (Schenectady, New York), NRHP-listed
 Horace Mann Junior High School, a junior high school in Kanawha City, West Virginia
 Horace Mann High School (North Fond du Lac, Wisconsin), North Fond du Lac, Wisconsin
 Horace Mann School (Saint Paul, Minnesota), an elementary school in Saint Paul, Minnesota

See also
 Horace Mann Middle School (disambiguation)
 Horace Mann (disambiguation)